The S&P Global 100 Index is a stock market index of global stocks from Standard & Poor's.

The S&P Global 100 measures the performance of 100 multi-national companies. It includes 100 large-cap companies from the S&P Global 1200 whose businesses are global in nature, and that derive a substantial portion of their operating income from multiple countries. This index meets the needs of investors wishing to track the performance of global companies. With 100 highly liquid constituents, it is designed to support low-cost, index investment products, including exchange-traded funds and listed derivatives such as futures contracts and options. The companies are selected from 29 local markets, and are weighted in the index by their market capitalization.

Components

(as of October 2013)

See also
Dow Jones Global Titans 50
BBC Global 30
S&P 100
S&P Global 1200
iShares S&P Global 100

References

External links
 Standard & Poor's page for S&P Global 100 Index
 Bloomberg page for S&P Global 100 index

Global stock market indices
S&P Dow Jones Indices